The Mohammed VI Football Academy is a football academy located in Salé, Morocco. It was inaugurated by the king Mohammed VI in 2009 to reshape the national sport in Morocco. 

The purpose of the academy is to help evolve football in Morocco and help football players toward reaching their goal, playing in a professional league.

Foundation and development

Background 
The project follows a series of programmes established by Mohammed VI and his advisors to ensure the development of Morocco. This project was inspired by the lack of sports facilities and shortage of talented footballers in the country. In this case, the construction of a football academy was planned to promote sports in Morocco and produce the next generation of footballers.

Objectives 
This project was conceived to attain certain objectives including: 
 Finding young talents across the country
 Targeting underprivileged areas in Rabat 
 Implementing a Sport-Study curriculum
 Developing the national Football field 
 Preparing junior footballers for professional leagues

Foundation 
In 2007, the Moroccan monarch instructed Groupe 3 Architectes to build a football academy in Sala Al Jadida. The project costed around MAD140 million. In the beginning, project manager Nasser Larguet toured the country to find adequate candidates. Afterwards, the academy started a testing system to accept students. The North-African Academy is managed by Compagnie Générale Immobilière, a non-profit organization. The academy is presided by the personal royal secretary of King Mohamed VI, Mounir El Majidi, who is also the head of FUS Rabat.

King Mohamed VI supported the project by presenting financial aids to encourage similar initiatives in other cities and to guarantee the progress of Football activities in the country.

In March 2010, King Mohammed VI inaugurated the academy which aims to provide education, mentoring and football training for its students. The Academy opened its doors in September 2010. It is destined for around 50 candidates aged between 13 and 18 years old. This educational sports facility is financially supported by personal funding from the king. It has also received a part of private investments from ONA, Maroc Télécom, Addoha, BMCE, CDG and AttijariWafa bank.

In 2015, similar academies were launched in several cities across Morocco such as Agadir, Tangier, Saïdia...

Structure 
The Academy is located near the Bouregreg river and it covers the area of 2.5 km². It is composed of two main areas: The open space (playing fields, and outdoor space for other activities) and a village.

The academy is built to be a modern facility that encloses Moroccan cultural heritage. It is arranged to follow the shape of a traditional douar, with a central village square surrounded by five buildings. Each building caters for a specific function (lodging, education, a medical facility and a canteen). Landscaped patios were designed to ensure the relaxation of the young footballers.

School 
A school was constructed following the guidelines of a Sport-study curriculum. It offers a three-level programme for students with the first level being a preparatory stage to help them adjust. The school encompasses 10 classrooms, along with a language and a computer science classroom. The teaching programme provided by the academy is supported by the ministry of education.

Sports village 
The Facility presents its students with four stadiums constructed under FIFA guidelines. A half synthetic football pitch, one training box drill, four locker rooms and a special training box drill for goalkeepers.

Medical centre 
The medical centre is composed of a clinic, a physiotherapist office and a balneotherapy pool.

Tournaments 
Every Year, The AMF organizes international football tournaments, which involves clubs from all over the world mainly Europe. The 5th edition was won by Génération Foot.

Notable players 
Youssef En-Nesyri
Hamza Mendyl
Nayef Aguerd
Azzedine Ounahi
Abdelwahed Wahib
Abdel Abqar

References

External links

Football academies in Africa
Football clubs in Morocco
2009 establishments in Morocco
Sport in Salé
National football academies